James Lake is a lake in northeastern Ontario, Canada, located in the Temagami region along Highway 11.

History
Water levels of James Lake increased and decreased in the early 1900s. The cause of this alternation could have been caused by beavers building dams in the lake's outlet, eventually causing the water levels in rise. This rise in water levels began to cease in 1906 when operations of Northland Pyrite Mine on the lake's southwestern shore dumped waste rock into the lake. Erosion of the waste rock resulted in the development of acidic lake waste waters next to the waste pile, causing neighboring organisms to disappear.

See also
Lakes of Temagami

References

Lakes of Temagami
Lakes of Timiskaming District